Jill Henneberg (born September 22, 1974) is an American equestrian. She won a silver medal in team  eventing at the 1996 Summer Olympics in Atlanta, together with Karen O'Connor, David O'Connor and Bruce Davidson.

References

External links

1974 births
Living people
American female equestrians
Olympic silver medalists for the United States in equestrian
Equestrians at the 1996 Summer Olympics
Medalists at the 1996 Summer Olympics
21st-century American women